Chronicles I is the first of a two-part compilation of re-recorded hits by German rock band Eloy released in 1993. The second part, Chronicles II was released the following year.

Early Eloy albums had relatively poor sound quality, leading Frank Bornemann to re-record some of their most popular songs using modern recording technologies. He invited some of the former members of the band to play on the album.

Chronicles I contains songs from Ocean (1977), Silent Cries and Mighty Echoes (1979), Colours (1980), Planets (1981) and Time to Turn (1982) re-recorded and mixed in 1993. The album also contains one previously unreleased track from the album Destination (1992).

Track listing 
All tracks by Eloy

 "Poseidon's Creation" - 11:28 (from Ocean)
 "The Apocalypse" - 11:02 (from Silent Cries and Mighty Echoes)
 "Silhouette" - 3:10 (from Colours)
 "Mysterious Monolith" - 6:10 (from Planets)
 "Sphinx" - 6:22 (from Planets)
 "Illuminations" - 6:19 (from Colours)
 "End of an Odyssey" - 9:15 (from Time to Turn)
 "Time to Turn" - 3:33 (from Time to Turn)
 "Spirit in Chains" - 5:49 (unreleased title, recorded during the Destination sessions)
 "Say It Is Really True" - 4:25 (from Time to Turn)

Personnel 

 Frank Bornemann - guitar, vocals
 Michael Gerlach - keyboards

Eloy former members playing on this album :

 Klaus-Peter Matziol - bass
 Hannes Arkona - guitar
 Hannes Folberth - keyboards
 Fritz Randow - drums

Additional personnel :

 Nico Baretta - drums
 Lenny Mac Dowell - flute
 Amy, Sabine, Anne and Brigitte - vocals on "Time to Turn" and "The Apocalypse"

Technical personnel :

 Produced by Frank Bornemann
 Engineered by Gerhard Wolfe, Michael Gerlach
 Mixed by Gerhard Wolfe

References 

Eloy (band) albums
1993 compilation albums